Carlos Castillo Medrano (died January 15, 2013) was a Guatemalan politician, who was the mayor of Jutiapa.

Death
On January 15, 2013, he was shot at age 39.

References

2013 deaths
Guatemalan politicians
Year of birth missing